Deportivo Asociación de Vecinos Santa Ana is a Spanish football team based in Madrid, in the namesake community. Founded in 1974 it plays in Tercera División – Group 7, holding home games at Polideportivo Santa Ana, which has a capacity of 2,000 spectators.

Season to season

1 season in Segunda División B
21 seasons in Tercera División

Former players
 Munir El Haddadi
 David Mateos
 Derik Osede
 Fernando Morientes
 Juan Quero
 Joyce Moreno
 Mohamed Benkhayi

References

External links
Official website 
Futmadrid team profile 

Football clubs in Madrid
Association football clubs established in 1974
1974 establishments in Spain